Maxim Yakutsenya (born February 14, 1981) is a Russian professional ice hockey forward who plays for HC 07 Detva of the Slovak Extraliga (Slovak). In 2014 he received a special official award from the KHL called Iron Man, for playing more games than any other player in the last 3 years.

References

External links

1981 births
Living people
Avangard Omsk players
HC CSKA Moscow players
HC Donbass players
Metallurg Magnitogorsk players
Metallurg Novokuznetsk players
HC Neftekhimik Nizhnekamsk players
Salavat Yulaev Ufa players
Traktor Chelyabinsk players
Russian ice hockey forwards